Portage County is a county  in the U.S. state of Wisconsin. As of the 2020 census, the population was 70,377. Its county seat is Stevens Point.

Portage County comprises the Stevens Point, WI Micropolitan Statistical Area and is included in the Wausau-Stevens Point-Wisconsin Rapids, WI Combined Statistical Area.

History
Portage County was created from the Wisconsin Territory in 1836 and organized in 1844. Like the city of Portage, Portage County is named for the portage between the Fox and Wisconsin rivers; Portage County originally included the portage and Portage but boundary changes detached the county from its namesake.

Geography

Major highways

Railroads
Canadian National

Buses
Stevens Point Transit
List of intercity bus stops in Wisconsin

Airport
 KSTE - Stevens Point Municipal Airport

Adjacent counties
 Marathon County - north
 Shawano County - northeast
 Waupaca County - east
 Waushara County - southeast
 Adams County - southwest
 Wood County - west

Wildlife refuges
 Buena Vista Marsh
 Dewey Marsh
 Mead Wildlife Area
 Paul J. Olson Wildlife Area

Demographics

2020 census
As of the census of 2020, the population was 70,377. The racial makeup of the county was 89.5% White, 3.2% Asian, 1.3% Black or African American, 0.4% Native American, 1.3% from other races, and 4.2% from two or more races. Ethnically, the population was 3.7% Hispanic or Latino of any race.

2000 census
As of the census of 2000, there were 67,182 people, 25,040 households, and 16,501 families residing in the county. The population density was 83 people per square mile (32/km2). There were 26,589 housing units at an average density of 33 per square mile (13/km2).  The racial makeup of the county was 95.73% White, 0.32% Black or African American, 0.36% Native American, 2.25% Asian, 0.04% Pacific Islander, 0.43% from other races, and 0.86% from two or more races. 1.44% of the population were Hispanic or Latino of any race. 32.8% were of Polish, 31.6% German, 5.4% Norwegian and 5.0% Irish ancestry. 93.9% spoke English, 1.7% Spanish, 1.6% Polish and 1.3% Hmong as their first language.

There were 25,040 households, out of which 32.10% had children under the age of 18 living with them, 55.10% were married couples living together, 7.30% had a female householder with no husband present, and 34.10% were non-families. 24.50% of all households were made up of individuals, and 8.80% had someone living alone who was 65 years of age or older. The average household size was 2.54 and the average family size was 3.07.

In the county, the population was spread out, with 24.10% under the age of 18, 16.20% from 18 to 24, 27.70% from 25 to 44, 21.10% from 45 to 64, and 10.90% who were 65 years of age or older. The median age was 33 years. For every 100 females there were 99.40 males. For every 100 females age 18 and over, there were 96.80 males.

In 2017, there were 674 births, giving a general fertility rate of 46.4 births per 1000 women aged 15–44, the third lowest rate out of all 72 Wisconsin counties.

Communities

City
 Stevens Point (county seat)

Villages

 Almond
 Amherst
 Amherst Junction
 Junction City
 Milladore (mostly in Wood County)
 Nelsonville
 Park Ridge
 Plover
 Rosholt
 Whiting

Towns

 Alban
 Almond
 Amherst
 Belmont
 Buena Vista
 Carson
 Dewey
 Eau Pleine
 Grant
 Hull
 Lanark
 Linwood
 New Hope
 Pine Grove
 Plover
 Sharon
 Stockton

Census-designated places
 Bancroft
 Polonia

Unincorporated communities

 Alban
 Arnott
 Badger
 Blaine
 Casimir
 Coddington
 Custer
 Dopp
 Ellis
 Esker
 Fancher
 Garfield
 Heffron (partial)
 Keene
 Kellner (partial)
 Little Waupon
 Jordan
 Meehan
 Mill Creek Community
 New Hope
 North Star
 Peru
 Rocky Run
 Stockton
 Torun
 West Almond
 West Bancroft

Ghost town/neighborhood
 Lake Emily

Politics
Portage County has been reliably Democratic in presidential elections since Dwight Eisenhower's win in 1956. However, recent elections have suggested that the county is turning into a battleground area, with Donald Trump holding the margin in the county to within 5%.

See also
 National Register of Historic Places listings in Portage County, Wisconsin

References

Further reading
 Commemorative Biographical Record of the Upper Wisconsin Counties of Waupaca, Portage, Wood, Marathon, Lincoln, Oneida, Vilas, Langlade and Shawano. Chicago: J. H. Beers, 1895.
 Rosholt, Malcolm. Our County, Our Story: Portage County, Wisconsin. Stevens Point: Portage County Board of Supervisors, 1959.
 A Standard History of Portage County, Wisconsin. Chicago: Lewis Publishing Company, 1919.

External links

 Portage County government website
 Portage County map from the Wisconsin Department of Transportation
 Portage County Business Council, Inc.
 Portage County Historical Society

 
1844 establishments in Wisconsin Territory
Populated places established in 1844